James Smith (fl. 1780s) was one of two gardeners trained at the Royal Botanic Gardens, Kew, in London and sent by Joseph Banks to care for plants on a voyage to the British colony in New Holland (Australia) in 1789. Together with fellow gardener George Austin, Smith travelled on the fated storeship HMS Guardian carrying supplies to the new colony as a follow-up to the ships of the First Fleet which had arrived at Botany Bay in January 1788. The vessel was specially fitted out to carry agricultural crops to the new colony and the two gardeners were to care for the plants during the voyage. Plants were supplied by Brentford nurseryman Hugh Ronalds, at Banks' request.

See also
For details of the voyage and its fate see George Austin.
List of gardener-botanist explorers of the Enlightenment
 European and American voyages of scientific exploration.

References

Bibliography

 
 

1789 deaths
Explorers of Australia
English gardeners
English emigrants to colonial Australia
Convictism in Australia
History of New South Wales
Maritime history of Australia
Year of birth unknown